was the forty-third of the  sixty-nine stations of the Nakasendō connecting Edo with Kyoto in Edo period Japan. It is located in former Mino Province in what is now part of the city of Nakatsugawa, Gifu Prefecture, Japan. It was also the last of eleven stations along the Kisoji, which was the precursor to a part of the Nakasendō, running through the Kiso Valley.

History

Magome-juku is located in a very mountainous section of the highway between Mino and Shinano Province. In places, the road was very steep and in the section between Magome-juku and the next station to the east, Tsumago-juku, travelers had to navigate an 800 meter mountain pass. The village is very old, and appears in Kamakura period records dated 1215 as part of the Tōyama Shōen, which had been awarded by Minamoto no Yoritomo to Kikuhime, the half-sister of Minamoto no Yoshinaka who lived in this location. In records dated 1487, it was referred to as "Kiso Magome" or "Ena-gun Magome", although Magoma was in Mino, and not in the Kiso River valley. In the early Edo period, the system of post stations on the Nakasendō was formalized by the Tokugawa shogunate in 1602, and it became a stopping place for traveling merchants and it was also on the sankin-kōtai route used by various western daimyō to-and-from the Shogun's court in Edo. 

The post station was 326.7 kilometers from Edo.

In the modern period, with  the completion of the Chūō Main Line railway, it fell into obscurity and poverty; and many of its old buildings were destroyed by fires in 1895 and 1915.  In recent decades, it has been restored to its appearance as an Edo period post town and is now a popular tourist destination. The central feature of Magome is its restored row of houses along the former post road, which runs at a slope between the town's low and high ends. Most were built for common people in the mid-18th century, with shops and inns for travelers along the Nakasendō. A quiet portion of the original highway has been preserved between Magome-juku and Tsumago-juku, which was also restored. It provides for a pleasant walk through forests and past waterfalls. Bus service is also provided between the two post towns, allowing visitors to easily start at either end of the path.

Notes of interest
Magome was the birthplace and childhood home of noted author Shimazaki Tōson, who wrote about the Kiso region in his most famous novel, Before the Dawn, between 1929 and 1935. He is buried in the town's small cemetery.

The town also offers a fine view of Mount Ena, which rises . Panoramic views of the surrounding mountains may be enjoyed from a vista above the main parking lot at Magome's upper end.

Gallery

Magome-juku in The Sixty-nine Stations of the Kiso Kaidō
Utagawa Hiroshige's ukiyo-e print of Magome-juku dates from 1835 -1838. The print depicts the pass between Magome-juku and Tsumago-juku, with a narrow road wedged between the side of a mountain and a steep cliff. A man is followed by two Kago (palanquin) bearers, one of whom is carrying the empty kago by one pole on his shoulder while the other is retying his straw sandal. A man is approaching from the opposite direction, but we can see only the top of his straw hat, emphasizing the steep slope of the road. Further in the distance, an oxherd is riding his ox past a waterfall, and the roofs of the post station can be seen in the valley below. In the distance, Mount Ena looms as a grey shadow.

Neighboring post towns

Nakasendō
Tsumago-juku - Magome-juku - Ochiai-juku
Kisoji
Tsumago-juku - Magome-juku (ending location)

References

External links

Hiroshige Kiso-Kaido series
Magome-juku on Kiso Kaido Road
Gifu Nakasendo Guide

Notes

Stations of the Nakasendō
Post stations in Gifu Prefecture
Nakatsugawa, Gifu
Mino Province